The Inter-National League was an international ice hockey league that was a partnership between the national federations of Austria and Slovenia. It was created as a solution to semi-professional hockey in both Austria and neighboring Slovenia. In 2016, the league merged with Serie A to form the Alps Hockey League.

History
The Inter-National League was founded on July 14, 2012 with seven teams joining the inaugural season. In Austria, seven out of eleven teams from the previous season's second tier, the Austrian National League, had left the league. Two teams, Dornbirner EC and TWK Innsbruck, were accepted into the Austrian Hockey League. The remaining teams either folded or chose to play in lower local leagues.

Acroni Jesenice was confirmed to become an inaugural member. However, due to financial problems the team informed the league that they would be folding effective August 31, 2012 (two weeks before the start of the season.)

On June 8, 2013, the league's 2013–14 season was decided and it saw the league jump from six teams to 15. After the late fold of Acroni Jesenice, Team Jesenice participated in the league this season as one of four new Slovenian clubs. The other three Slovenian newcomers were Bled, Maribor and Celje. The league also welcomed Italian sides SV Caldaro/Kaltern, Eppan Pirates, Merano Junior, Neumarkt-Egna Wildgoose and Gherdëina.

For the 2014–15 season, Maribor and the five Italian teams left the league, whereas Kitzbühel and Steelers Kapfenberg joined the competition. In addition, the teams were allowed four imports (two U-22, and two with no age limit). These imports could not have been exchanged between teams in the league.

Scheduling
The inaugural INL season started on September 15, 2012, while the last game in the regular season took place on March 2, 2013. The INL playoffs semi-finals and finals were all played in best-of-five format.

The scheduling for the INL was designed to keep the travel costs at a minimum. Each team played a total of 36 games in a set of six rounds (three home games, three away against all six opponents.) The league featured a "double weekend", where opponents were played on back-to-back games during the weekend.

Scoring
INL games were scored with the "three-point rule": three points for the winner after regular time, two points if teams win after overtime or shootout, and one for the loser after regular time.

Trades and transfers
Transfers were permitted during the season, but only if both teams reached an agreement.

Teams

Inter-National League seasons

References

External links
Inter-National League at eurohockey.com

 
Defunct multi-national ice hockey leagues in Europe
2
2
2
Sports leagues established in 2012
2
2016 disestablishments in Europe